Corruption in North Korea is a widespread and growing problem in North Korean society.

North Korea is ranked 171 out of 180 countries in Transparency International's 2022 Corruption Perceptions Index. The 180 countries of the Index are scored on a scale of 0 ("highly corrupt") to 100 ('very clean") according to the perceived corruption in the public sector, and then ranked by their score. The country whose public sector is perceived to be most corrupt is ranked 180th. North Korea's 2022 ranking was based on a score of 17. For comparison, the best score was 90 (ranked 1), the worst score was 12 (ranked 180), and the average score was 43. 

Strict rules and draconian punishments imposed by the regime, for example, against accessing foreign media or for modifying radio or television receivers to access foreign media, are commonly evaded by offering bribes to the police. Informing on colleagues and family members has become less common.

North Korea's state media admitted widespread corruption in North Korea, when laying out the accusations against Jang Song-thaek after his execution in December 2013. The statement mentions bribery, deviation of materials, selling resources and land, securing funds and squandering money for private use by organizations under his control.

See also 
 Crime in North Korea
 North Korea's illicit activities

References 

 
Politics of North Korea
North Korea